Caryocolum dilatatum is a moth of the family Gelechiidae. It is found in Syria and Iran.

References

Moths described in 1989
dilatatum
Moths of Asia